Delton is a census-designated place (CDP) in Barry Township in Barry County, Michigan, United States. The population was 872 at the 2010 census.

Geography
Delton is located in southwestern Barry County. It is bordered to the north by Hope Township. To the west the CDP extends slightly into Prairieville Township, Cloverdale and Cedar Creek. State highway M-43 runs through the town center, leading northeast  to Hastings and southwest  to downtown Kalamazoo.

The eastern end of Crooked Lake occupies the western part of the CDP.

Delton Kellogg High School, Middle School, and Elementary school are all located in the CDP, in the center of town.

Demographics

To Know 
In 1883 a railroad was created and went through Delton. In 2008 the last tracks were torn up. In 1936, Delton Kellogg Agricultural school was built, and that helped increase Delton's population. There are over 10 lakes in Delton.

Schools 
 Delton Kellogg Elementary School
 Delton Kellogg Middle School
 Delton Kellogg High School
 Kidz Care Center (Not Operational)
 Early Head Start
 Ceder Creek Christian School

References

Census-designated places in Michigan
Unincorporated communities in Barry County, Michigan
Grand Rapids metropolitan area